Pedro Gamarro (January 8, 1955 – May 7, 2019) was a Venezuelan amateur boxer.

Gamarro represented his native country at the 1976 Summer Olympics in Montreal, Quebec, Canada. There, he won the silver medal in the welterweight division (– 67 kg) after having lost to Jochen Bachfeld of East Germany in the final. Gamarro's medal was the only one won by the South American nation in Montreal.

A year earlier, Gamarro had won a bronze medal at the 1975 Pan American Games. In between, he also won a bronze medal at the 1983 Pan American Games held in his home country.

Gamarro died in 2019 at the age of 64.

1976 Olympic results
Below are the results of Gamarro at the 1976 Montreal Olympics:
 Round of 64: Bye
 Round of 32: Defeated Marijan Beneš (Yugoslavia) by decision, 5-0
 Round of 16: Defeated Emilio Correa (Cuba), when referee stopped the contest in the third round
 Quarterfinal: Defeated Clint Jackson (United States) by decision, 3-2
 Semifinal: Defeated Reinhard Skricek (West Germany) by decision, 3-2
 Final: Lost to Jochen Bachfeld (East Germany) by decision, 2-3 (was awarded silver medal)

Sources

External links
 Database Olympics
 Sports Reference

1955 births
2019 deaths
Boxers at the 1975 Pan American Games
Boxers at the 1976 Summer Olympics
Boxers at the 1983 Pan American Games
Medalists at the 1976 Summer Olympics
Olympic boxers of Venezuela
Olympic medalists in boxing
Olympic silver medalists for Venezuela
Pan American Games bronze medalists for Venezuela
Pan American Games medalists in boxing
People from Zulia
Venezuelan male boxers
Welterweight boxers
Medalists at the 1975 Pan American Games
Medalists at the 1983 Pan American Games
20th-century Venezuelan people